
This is a list of aircraft in alphabetical order beginning with 'H'.

H – He

Hackel 
(Yakov Modestovich Gakkel)
 Hackel I 1909
 Hackel I
 Hackel II
 Hackel III
 Hackel IV
 Hackel V
 Hackel VI
 Hackel VII
 Hackel VIII
 Hackel IX

Hackenberger 
(A L Hackenberger, San Antonio, TX, 1938: Las Vegas, NV)
 Hackenberger 1A
 Hackenberger H

Hadley & Blood 
(C O Hadley, Mineola, NY)
 Hadley & Blood 1911 Biplane

Hærens Flyvemaskinfabrikk
(Hærens Flyvemaskinfabrikk – Navy aircraft factory)
 Hærens Flyvemaskinfabrikk FF.1 (based on Farman biplanes seen by Einar Sem-Jacobsen)
 Hærens Flyvemaskinfabrikk FF.2 (Based on FF.1)
 Hærens Flyvemaskinfabrikk FF.3 Hydro Based on Farman F.40
 Hærens Flyvemaskinfabrikk FF.4
 Hærens Flyvemaskinfabrikk FF.5 (T.1)
 Hærens Flyvemaskinfabrikk FF.6 (T.2)
 Hærens Flyvemaskinfabrikk FF.7 Hauk Hannoversche Waggonfabrik's CL.V built under licence
 Hærens Flyvemaskinfabrikk FF.8 Måke Hansa-Brandenburg W.29 built under licence
 Hærens Flyvemaskinfabrikk FF.9 Kaje

Haeco 
(Robert Hatfield, Imperial, CA)
 Haeco Hornet

Haessler
(Helmut Haessler / Haessler-Villinger)
 Haessler-Villinger H.V.1
 Haessler H3

Häfeli
(August Häfeli)
 Häfeli DH-1
 Häfeli DH-2
 Häfeli DH-3
 Häfeli DH-4
 Häfeli DH-5
 Militär-Apparat MA-7

Hafner 
(Raoul Hafner)
 Hafner-Rath HR-1 Gelse (with Josef Rath)
 Hafner R.I
 Hafner R.II
 Hafner A.R.III Gyroplane
 Hafner A.R.IV Gyroplane
 Hafner A.R.V Gyroplane
 Hafner PD.6
 Hafner H.8 Rotachute
 Hafner Rotabuggy

Hagiwara
(Hisao Hagiwara / Jiyu Koku Kenkyusho (Liberty Aeronautical Research Institute))
 Hagiwara JHX-1
 Hagiwara JHX-2
 Hagiwara JHX-3
 Hagiwara JHX-4

Hagness 
(Ernest Hagness, Portland, TX)
 Hagness Hokey Pokey#1

HAI 
(Hellenic Aerospace Industry)
 HAI Pegasus

Haig 
(Joseph Haig)
 Haig 1986 Monoplane

Haig 
(Larry Haig)
 Haig Minibat

Haig-K 
(Haig-K Aircraft Corp, Swedsford Rd, Paoli, PA)
 Haig-K HK-1

Haigh 
(Henry Haigh, Howell, MI)
 Haigh Super Star

Haim 
(Haim Aviation Inc.)
 Haim Sam LS

Haines 
(Frank J Haines, Daytona Beach, FL and Detroit, MI)
 Haines H-2
 Haines H-3 Firefly
 Haines Low-Wing

HAL 
 HAL Tejas
 HAL HF-24 Marut
 HAL Basant
 HAL HF-73
 HAL Ajeet
 HAL Tejas Mk2
 HAL AMCA
 HAL TEDBF
 HAL Dhruv
 HAL Rudra
 HAL Light Combat Helicopter
 HAL Light Utility Helicopter
 HAL IMRH
 HAL HT-2
 HAL HPT-32 Deepak
 HAL HJT-16 Kiran
 HAL HTT-35
 HAL HJT-36 Sitara
 HAL HTT-40
 HAL HJT 39
 HAL Krishak
 HAL/NAL Regional Transport Aircraft
 HAL Saras
 HAL Pushpak

Halberstadt 
(Halberstädter Flugzeug-Werke G.m.b.H.)
 Halberstadt B.I
 Halberstadt B.II
 Halberstadt B.III
 Halberstadt C.I
 Halberstadt C.III
 Halberstadt C.V
 Halberstadt C.VII
 Halberstadt C.VIII
 Halberstadt C.IX
 Halberstadt CL.II
 Halberstadt CL.IV
 Halberstadt CLS.I
 Halberstadt D.I
 Halberstadt D.II
 Halberstadt D.III
 Halberstadt D.IV
 Halberstadt D.V
 Halberstadt G.I
 Halberstadt A15
 Halberstadt B15

Halbronn 
(Robert Halbronn & Todd)
 Halbronn H.T.1 a.k.a. Labourdette-Halbron 
 Halbronn H.T.2

Hales 
(Hales Aircraft, Oklahoma City, OK)
 Hales 1932 Monoplane
 Hales 1933 Monoplane
 Hales 102

Hall 
(Ernest C Hall, Warren, OH)
 Hall 1911 Monoplane

Hall 
(Robert P Hall, Searchlight, NV)
 Hall 1911 Monoplane

Hall 
(Hall Aeroplane Company (Charles S Hall), 807 North Spring St, Los Angeles, CA)
 Hall Helicopter Aeroplane

Hall 
(Robert "Bert" Hall & Porter Roberts, Lindsay, OK)
 Hall A

Hall 
(Theodore P Hall Engr Corp, Spreckels Bldg, San Diego, CA)
 Hall 118 flying Auto
 Hall XCP-1

Hall/Hall-Springfield 
(Springfield Aircraft Inc (Fdr: Robert L Hall), Springfield, MA)
 Hall Bulldog
 Hall Cicada

Hall Aluminium 
(Charles Ward Hall Inc, Mamaroneck, NY, 1927: Hall Aluminum Aircraft Corp, Buffalo, NY)
 Hall Aluminium Air Yacht
 Hall Aluminium Monoped
 Hall XFH
 Hall PH
 Hall XP2H
 Hall XPTBH

Halladay 
(C L Halladay, Jackson, MI)
 Halladay 1911 pusher
 Halladay 1911 Racer
 Halladay 1915 Flying Boar

Hallas 
(Charles Hallas, Northville, MN)
 Hallas 1929 Monoplane

Haller 
(Rudolf Haller)
 Haller Ha 6
 Haller Ha 22
 Haller Ha 23

Haller
(Oldřich haller)
 Haller H-8
 Haller H-9
 Haller H-11

Halligan 
(Russel and Francis Halligan, Beardstown, IL)
 Halligan 1923 Helicopter

Hallock 
(Bruce Hallock, Austin, TX)
 Hallock Road Wing (a.k.a. HT-1)
 Hallock Pterodactyl

Halpin 
((Thomas E) Halpin Development Co, Lunken Airport, Cincinnati, OH)
 Halpin Flamingo

Halpin-Huf 
(Richard Halpin and Tom Huf)
 H&H Fun Special

Halsmer 
(Joseph L Halsmer, Lafayette, IN)
 Halsmer Aero Car 3
 Halsmer Safety Twin

Halsted 
{Barry Halsted}
(Barry Halsted, Fountain Valley, CA)
 Halsted BH-1 Saffire

Halton 
(Halton Aero Club)
 Halton HAC.1 Mayfly
 Halton HAC.2 Minus
 Halton HAC.3 Meteor

Hamao
(T Hamao)
 Hamao Siakara Tombo

Hamble River, Luke & Co Limited
 Hamble River H.L.1 Seaplane

Hamburger Flugzeugbau 
 Hamburger Flugzeugbau Ha 135
 Hamburger Flugzeugbau Ha 136
 Hamburger Flugzeugbau Ha 137
 Hamburger Flugzeugbau Ha 138
 Hamburger Flugzeugbau Ha 139
 Hamburger Flugzeugbau Ha 140
 Hamburger Flugzeugbau Ha 141
 Hamburger Flugzeugbau Ha 142

Hamilton 
(Charles K Hamilton, Mineola, NY)
 Hamilton Hamiltonian

Hamilton 
 Hamilton 1910 Aeroplane
 Hamilton 1911 Aeroplane
 Hamilton 1912 Tractor Biplane
 Hamilton 1913 Biplane
 Hamilton 1915 Flying Boat
 Hamilton 1915 Aeroplane (Curtiss copy)
 Hamilton 1916 Tractor Biplane
 Hamilton H-18
 Hamilton H-19 Silver Eagle
 Hamilton H-20 Silver Swan
 Hamilton H-21
 Hamilton H-22 Silver Sea-dan
 Hamilton H-23
 Hamilton H-43
 Hamilton H-45
 Hamilton H-47 (a.k.a. Special)
 Hamilton C-89

Hamilton 
(J W Hamilton, Mineola, NY)
 Hamilton 1911 Monoplane

Hamilton 
(Hamilton Helicopter Co, Baltimore, MD)
 Hamilton 1949 Helicopter

Hamilton 
((Gordon B) Hamilton Aircraft Co Inc, Tucson, AZ)
 Hamilton HA-1 (conv. of TC-45J N28471)
 Hamilton Little Liner (Beech18/C-45 Conv.s)
 Hamilton T-28R Nomair (T-28 conversions)
 Hamilton Westwind (Beech 18 turboprop conversions)

Hamilton 
(Hamilton Aerospace. San Antonio, TX)
 Hamilton H-1
 Hamilton HX-321
 Hamilton HXT-2

Hamilton
(Tom Hamilton)
 Hamilton Glasair

Hammer 
(Russell Hammer, Indianapolis, IN)
 Hammer ANZ-3

Hammer-Hunt
(Altitude Unlimited Inc (Bob Hammer & Dick Hunt), Paine Field, WA)
 Hammer-Hunt HH-1 Zipper

Hammond 
((Dean B) Hammond Aircraft Corp, Ann Arbor, MI)
 Hammond 100
 Hammond Y
 Stearman-Hammond Y-125

Hampton 
(Hampton Engr Co (Arnold & David Biermann, engrs at NACA), 310 Marshall St, Hampton, VA)
 Hampton 1930 Monoplane

Hancock 
(Allan Hancock Foundation (College), Santa Maria, CA)
 Hancock Cadet

Handasyde
(Handasyde Aircraft Company, United Kingdom)
 Handasyde H.2
 Handasyde Monoplane
 Handasyde glider

H&E Paramotores
(Madrid, Spain)
 H&E Paramotores Corsario
 H&E Paramotores Simonini
 H&E Paramotores Solo
 H&E Paramotores Ziklon

Hand-Hoffman 
(Edgar Hand & Jack Hoffman, Susalito, CA)
 Hand-Hoffman 1908 Monoplane

Handley 
(Wayne Handley, Greenfield, CA)
 Handley Raven T

Handley Page 
Handley Page Type A – monoplane (1910) (HP.1)
Handley Page Type B – biplane (HP.2)
Handley Page Type D – monoplane (1911) (HP.4)
Handley Page Type E – monoplane (HP.5)
Handley Page Type F – monoplane (HP.6)
Handley Page Type G – biplane (HP.7)
Handley Page Type L – biplane – never flew (HP.8)
Handley Page HP.14 –
Handley Page Type O – twin-engined bomber (HP.16)
Handley Page O/7 bomber
Handley Page O/10 airliner
Handley Page O/11 airliner
Handley Page O/100
Handley Page O/400
Handley Page Type S
Handley Page Type T
Handley Page Type Ta
Handley Page V/1500
Handley Page Type W airliner
Handley Page W.8
Handley Page W.9
Handley Page W/400 airliner
Handley Page HP.18
Handley Page HP.19 Hanley
Handley Page HP.22
Handley Page HP.23
Handley Page HP.24 Hyderabad
Handley Page HP.25 Hendon
Handley Page HP.26 Hamilton
Handley Page HP.27 Hampstead
Handley Page HP.28 Handcross
Handley Page HP.30
Handley Page HP.31 Harrow
Handley Page HP.32 Hamlet
Handley Page HP.33 Hinaidi I
Handley Page HP.34 Hare
Handley Page HP.35 Clive
Handley Page HP.36 Hinaidi II
Handley Page HP.38 Heyford prototype
Handley Page HP.39 Gugnunc
Handley Page HP.42 ("HP.42E" – Eastern)
Handley Page HP.43
Handley Page HP.45 ("HP.42W" – Western)
Handley Page HP.50 Heyford production
Handley Page HP.51
Handley Page HP.52 Hampden
Handley Page HP.53 Hereford
Handley Page HP.54 Harrow
Handley Page HP.57 Halifax
Handley Page HP.57 Halifax B Mk.I
Handley Page HP.59 Halifax B Mk.II
Handley Page HP.61 Halifax B Mk.III
Handley Page HP.63 Halifax B Mk.V
Handley Page HP.70 Halifax C Mk.VIII
Handley Page HP.71 Halifax A Mk.IX
Handley Page HP.67 Hastings C Mk.1
Handley Page HP.94 Hastings C Mk.4
Handley Page HP.95 Hastings C Mk.3
Handley Page HP.68 Hermes 1
Handley Page HP.74 Hermes 2
Handley Page HP.81 Hermes 4
Handley Page HP.82 Hermes 5
Handley Page HP.70 Halton
Handley Page HP.75 Manx
Handley Page HP.80 Victor
Handley Page HP.87
Handley Page HP.88
Handley Page HP.100
Handley Page HP.113
Handley Page HP.115
Handley Page HP.137 Jetstream

Handley Page (Reading) 
Formed from assets of Miles Aircraft

Handley Page HPR.1 Marathon – airliner developed by Miles
Handley Page HPR.2 Basic Trainer – basic trainer
Handley Page HPR.3 Herald – prototype for Dart Herald airliner
Handley Page HPR.5 Marathon – Miles M.69 Marathon II used engine test bed
Handley Page HPR.7 Dart Herald – airliner

Hanes 
(Arnold Hanes, Los Angeles, CA)
 Hanes H-1 Hornet

Hanken 
(William B Hanken, Monticello, IA)
 Hanken HDT-681

Hannaford
 Hannaford Bee

Hannover 
(Hannoversche Waggonfabrik A.G.)
 Hannover C.I
 Hannover CL.II
 Hannover CL.III
 Hannover CL.IV
 Hannover CL.V
 Hannover F.3
 Hannover F.10

Hanriot 
(René Hanriot / The Monoplans Hanriot Company Ltd / Aéroplanes Hanriot et Cie)
(Designations;Hanriot-Dupont:HD – 1916 to 1930; Lorraine-Hanriot:LH – 1930 to 1933; 1933 onward reverted to H (those LH still in use or production were re-designated).)
Hanriot 1907 Monoplane 
Hanriot 1909 monoplane
Hanriot 1910 Type-1 Monoplane
Hanriot 1910 Type-II Monoplane"Libellule" ("Dragonfly")
Hanriot 1910 Type-III Monoplane
Hanriot 1911 Type-IV Monoplane
Hanriot 1912 Monoplane
Hanriot HD.1
Hanriot HD.2
Hanriot HD.3
Hanriot HD.3bis
Hanriot HD.4
Hanriot HD.5
Hanriot HD.6
Hanriot HD.7
Hanriot HD.8
Hanriot HD.9
Hanriot HD.12
Hanriot HD.14
Hanriot HD.14S
Hanriot HD.15
Hanriot HD.17
Hanriot HD.18
Hanriot HD.19
Hanriot HD.20
Hanriot HD.22
Hanriot HD.24
Hanriot HD.27
Hanriot HD.28
Hanriot HD.29
Hanriot HD.32
Hanriot HD.40S
Hanriot HD.41H
Hanriot HD.54
Hanriot HD.141
Hanriot HD.320
Hanriot HD.321
Hanriot LH.10
Hanriot LH.11
Hanriot LH 11bis
Hanriot LH.12
Hanriot LH.13
Hanriot LH.16
Hanriot LH.21S
Hanriot LH.30
Hanriot LH.40
Hanriot LH.41
Hanriot LH.41.02
Hanriot LH.42
Hanriot LH.431
Hanriot LH.50
Hanriot LH.60
Hanriot LH.61
Hanriot LH.70
Hanriot LH.80
Hanriot LH.110
Hanriot LH.130
Hanriot LH.131-01
Hanriot LH.131-02
Hanriot LH.412
Hanriot LH.431
Hanriot LH.432
Hanriot LH.433
Hanriot LH.437
Hanriot H.14CR
Hanriot H.16
Hanriot H.19 Et2
Hanriot H.25T
Hanriot H.26
Hanriot H.29
Hanriot H.31
Hanriot H.33
Hanriot H.34
Hanriot H.35
Hanriot H.36
Hanriot H.38
Hanriot H.41
Hanriot H.43
Hanriot H.46 Styx
Hanriot H.110
Hanriot H.110 (LH 110)
Hanriot H.115
Hanriot H.131-01
Hanriot H.131-02
Hanriot H.161
Hanriot H.170
Hanriot H.170M
Hanriot H.171
Hanriot H.172B
Hanriot H.172N
Hanriot H.173
Hanriot H.174
Hanriot H.175
Hanriot H.180
Hanriot H.180T
Hanriot H.181
Hanriot H.182
Hanriot H.183
Hanriot H.184
Hanriot H.185
Hanriot H.190M
Hanriot H.191
Hanriot H.192B
Hanriot H.192N
Hanriot H.195
Hanriot H.220
Hanriot H.230
Hanriot H.231
Hanriot H.232
Hanriot H.410
Hanriot H.411
Hanriot H.436
Hanriot H.438
Hanriot H.439
Hanriot H.461
Hanriot H.462
Hanriot H.463
Hanriot H.464
Hanriot H.465
Hanriot H.510

Hansa-Brandenburg 
(Hansa und Brandenburgische Flugzeug-Werke G.m.b.H.)
 Hansa-Brandenburg B.I
 Hansa-Brandenburg C.I
 Hansa-Brandenburg C.II
 Hansa-Brandenburg D.I
 Hansa-Brandenburg CC
 Hansa-Brandenburg D
 Hansa-Brandenburg DD
 Hansa-Brandenburg FB
 Hansa-Brandenburg FD
 Hansa-Brandenburg G.I
 Hansa-Brandenburg GDW
 Hansa-Brandenburg GF
 Hansa-Brandenburg GNW
 Hansa-Brandenburg GW
 Hansa-Brandenburg KD
 Hansa-Brandenburg K
 Hansa-Brandenburg KDD
 Hansa-Brandenburg KDW
 Hansa-Brandenburg L.14
 Hansa-Brandenburg L.16
 Hansa-Brandenburg LDD
 Hansa-Brandenburg NW
 Hansa-Brandenburg W
 Hansa-Brandenburg W.11
 Hansa-Brandenburg W.12
 Hansa-Brandenburg W.13
 Hansa-Brandenburg W.16
 Hansa-Brandenburg W.17
 Hansa-Brandenburg W.18
 Hansa-Brandenburg W.19
 Hansa-Brandenburg W.20
 Hansa-Brandenburg W.23
 Hansa-Brandenburg W.25
 Hansa-Brandenburg W.27
 Hansa-Brandenburg W.29
 Hansa-Brandenburg W.32
 Hansa-Brandenburg W.33
 Hansa-Brandenburg W.34
 Hansa-Brandenburg ZM

Hanseatische Flugzeug-Werke 
 Caspar D.I

Hansen 
(Perry D Hansen, Lansing, MI)
 Hansen Special

Hansen 
(Willam Hansen)
 Hansen WH-1 Thunderchicken

Hansen-Loock 
(Lorrin L Hansen & Rev Carl H Loock, Rapid City, SD)
 Hansen-Loock 1930 Dirigible

Hanson 
(Carl L Hanson, Mercer Island, WA)
 Hanson Woodwind

Hants & Sussex
(Hants and Sussex Aviation Ltd.)
 Hants & Sussex Herald

Hanuschke 
 Hanuschke Monoplane

HAPI 
(HAPI Engines)
 HAPI SF2A Cygnet

HAPSMobile
 HAPSMobile Hawk30

Harbin (HAMC) 
 Dongfeng-113
 Song Hua Jiang-1
 Heilongjiang-1 (Harbin Aviation Polytechnic School)
 Harbin model 701
 Harbin B-5
 Harbin H-5
 Harbin SH-5
 Harbin Y-11
 Harbin Y-12
 Harbin Z-5
 Harbin/CHDRI Z-6
 Harbin Z-9
 Harbin Z-15
 Harbin Z-19
 Harbin Z-20

Hardwick-Whittenbeck 
(Dennis Hardwick & Clem Whittenbeck, Joplin, MO)
 Hardwick-Whittenbeck HW Special

Harlequin 
(Harlequin Flying Club, San Francisco, CA)
 Harlequin 1931 Monoplane

Harley-Stromer 
(Oregon Aircraft Co (Mayor Harley and Gus Stromer), Astoria, OR)
 Harley-Stromer 'Oregon Maid'

Harlow
(Harlow Aircraft Corp (Pres: J B Alexander), Alhambra, CA)
 Harlow C-80
 Harlow PJC-1
 Harlow PJC-2
 Harlow PJC-4
 Harlow PJC-5
 Harlow PC-5
 Harlow PC-5A
 Harlow PC-6

Harmening's High Flyers
(Genoa, IL)
Harmening High Flyer

Harmon
(Harmon Engineering Company)
 Harmon Der Donnerschlag
 Harmon Mister America

Harmon 
(C B Harmon)
 Harmon 1911 Biplane

Harmon 
(George Richard Harmon, Richmond, VA)
 Harmon 1935 Biplane

Harmon 
((D and John) Harmon Co Inc, Bakersfield, CA)
 Harmon Rocket 1 (Van's RV-3 Conv.)
 Harmon Rocket 11 (Van's RV-4 Conv.)
 Harmon Rocket 111 (Van's RV-5 Conv.)

Harmon-Spellman 
(Ralph Harmon & L L Spellman, Greenwood, IN)
 Harmon-Spellman Sport

Harper 
((Jack L) Harper Aircraft Mfg Co, Bedford and Elyra, OH)
 Harper 1-A
 Harper B-2
 Harper Roberts Special

Harper Aircraft
(Jacksonville, FL)
Harper Lil Breezy

Harriman 
(John Emery Harriman, Boston or Brookline, MA)
 Harriman 1904 Flying Machine
 Harriman 1910 Aerocar
 Harriman 1910 Aeromobile

Harriman 
((Frank H/Frank M) Harriman Motor Works, South Glastonbury, CT) (Flew in the 1913 Great Lakes Reliability Cruise)
 Harriman 1912 Biplane
 Harriman 1913 Hydro
 Harriman 1915 Triplane

Harriman 
(H E Harriman, Mineola, NY)
 Harriman 1919 Multi-Wing

Harris 
(Richard Hillman Harris, Atlanta, GA)
 Harris parasol

Harris 
(Douglas Harris, Pawtucket, RI)
 Harris 1930 Monoplane

Harris 
(Vernon C Harris, Heyworth, IL)
 Harris Little Jewel

Harris 
(J Warren Harris, Vernal, UT)
 Harris Geodetic#1
 Harris Geodetic#2
 Harris Geodetic LW 108

Harrison 
(Charles D Harrison)
 Harrison K1S-1

Harrison 
(Bruce Harrison, Redding, CA)
 Harrison Saunders Jethawk

Harth 
(George Harth, The Dalles, OR)
 Harth Sport

Hartman 
(Arthur J Hartman, Burlington, IA)
 Hartman 1910 Monoplane
 Burlington Biplane
 Burlington 1938 Monoplane
 Burlington H-1

Hartmann 
(Hartmann Aircraft Corp, Jordan, NY)
 Hartmann OW-5M

Hartwig 
(Hartwig Industries, San Antonio, TX)
 Hartwig Little 'Copter

Hartzell 
(Hartzell Walnut Propeller Co, Piqua, OH and Detroit, MI)
 Johnson-Hartzell FC-1
 Johnson-Hartzell FC-2
 Hartzell MR-1
 Hartzell XX

Harvard 
(Harvard Aeronautical Society, Cambridge, MA)
 Harvard Number 1

HarvEd 
(HarvEd Aircraft Co (Harvey Calbo & Edward F Smithana), 1515 Phillips Ave, Racine, WI)
 HarvEd 1928 Monoplane
 HarvEd 1929 Monoplane

Hash 
(Jack Hash, Crosbyton, TX)
 Hash Special

Hast 
(George Hast)
 Hast Wooden Baby

Hastings 
((Reed) Hastings Aeronautics Co, Hastings, NE)
 Hastings JCH-1

HAT 
(Hellenic Aeronautical Technologies)
 HAT LS2

Hatfield 
(Bob & Cliff Hatfield, Imperial, CA)
 Hatfield Haeco Hornet
 Hatfiel Racer

Hatfield 
(Milton Hatfield, Elkhart, IN)
 Hatfield Prototype
 Hatfield Prototype 2
 Hatfield Little Bird#1
 Hatfield Little Bird#2
 Hatfield Little Bird#3

Hatz 
(John D Hatz, Schofield and Merril, WI c.1980: Dudley R Kelly, Versailles, KY)
 Hatz CB-1

Hatzenbuhler 
(Howard F Hatzenbuhler, Mt Clemens, MI)
 Hatzenbuhler Packard A

Haufe 
(Walter H Haufe, Neenah, WI)
 Haufe Dale Hawk 2
 Haufe HA-G-1 Buggie
 Haufe HA-S-2 Hobby
 Haufe HA-S-3 Hawk
 Haufe Buzzer 2 Query Buzzard 2?
 Haufe Buzzard 2 Query Buzzer 2?

Hauptner 
(Edward Hauptner, Long Island, NY)
 Hauptner 1932 Biplane

Havertz 
(Hermann Havertz)
 Havertz HZ-5

Hawk 
((Ernie) Hawk Industries Inc, Yucca Valley, CA)
 Hawk GAFhawk 125
 Hawk Minihawk
 Hawk GAFHawk 950 – enlarged version (not built)
 Hawk TurboHawk 85

Hawke 
(Hawke Dusters (founders: Edwin R Hawke, John Cuneo), Modesto, CA)
 Hawke Duster
 Hawke SJ

Hawker 
(Hawker Aircraft ltd.)
 Hawker Audax
 Hawker Cygnet
 Hawker Danecock
 Hawker Demon
 Hawker Duiker
 Hawker F.20/27
 Hawker Fury
 Hawker Hardy
 Hawker Harrier
 Hawker Hart
 Hawker Hartebeeste
 Hawker Hawfinch
 Hawker Hector
 Hawker Hedgehog
 Hawker Henley
 Hawker Heron
 Hawker Hind
 Hawker Hoopoe
 Hawker Hornbill
 Hawker Hornet
 Hawker Horsley
 Hawker Hotspur
 Hawker Hunter
 Hawker Hurricane
 Hawker Nimrod
 Hawker Osprey
 Hawker P.1052
 Hawker P.1077
 Hawker P.1081
 Hawker P.1121
 Hawker P.1134
 Hawker P.V.3
 Hawker P.V.4
 Hawker Sea Fury
 Hawker Sea Hawk
 Hawker Siddeley HS 748
 Hawker Sea Hurricane
 Hawker Tempest
 Hawker Tomtit
 Hawker Tornado
 Hawker Typhoon
 Hawker Woodcock
 Hawker AXH (Hawker Navy Experimental Type H Carrier Fighter)

Hawker Siddeley
(Hawker Siddeley Aircraft (1935–1948) Hawker Siddeley Aviation (1948–1977)
Parent company of Armstrong Whitworth, Avro, Hawker, and Gloster companies)

 Hawker Siddeley Andover
 Hawker Siddeley Dominie
 Hawker Siddeley Harrier
 Hawker Siddeley Hawk
 Hawker Siddeley HS.125
 Hawker Siddeley HS.133
 Hawker Siddeley HS.138
 Hawker Siddeley P.139B
 Hawker Siddeley HS.145
 Hawker Siddeley HS.146
 Hawker Siddeley HS.141
 Hawker Siddeley HS.681
 Hawker Siddeley HS.748
 Hawker Siddeley HS.803
 Hawker Siddeley P.1127
 Hawker Siddeley P.1127 Kestrel
 Hawker Siddeley P.1127RAF
 Hawker Siddeley P.1154
 Hawker Siddeley P.1200
 Hawker Siddeley P.1201
 Hawker Siddeley P.1202
 Hawker Siddeley P.1207
 Hawker Siddeley Nimrod
 Hawker Siddeley Trident

Hayden
(Hayden Aircraft Corporation)
 Hayden Bushmaster 15-AT

Hawks 
((Frank) Hawks Aircraft Co, Springfield, MA)
 Hawks Miller HM-1

Hayden-Clark-O'Day 
(E E Hayden & Jess Clark, Visalia, CA)
 Hayden-Clark-O'Day W-6

Hayden-Payne-Kinney 
 Hayden-Payne-Kinney SPK-1

Hayes 
(O R Hayes, Charleston, VA)
 Hayes Sport NA-1

Haynes 
(Robin Haynes)
 Haynes Pintail

Haynes Aero
 Haynes Aero Skyblazer

HB-Flugtechnik
(HB-Flugtechnik GmbH / HB Aircraft Industries Luftfahrzeug AG)
 HB-Flugtechnik HB-202
 HB Flugtechnik HB-204 Tornado
 HB-Flugtechnik HB-207 Alfa
 HB-Flugtechnik HB-208 Amigo
 HB-Flugtechnik HB-400
 HB-Flugtechnik Cubby
 HB-Flugtechnik Dandy
 HB-Flugtechnik HB 21
 HB-23/2400 Hobbyliner
 HB-23/2400 Scanliner

HDM
 Hurel-Dubois Miles HDM.105
 HDM.106
 HDM.107
 HDM.108

Headberg 
(Headberg Aviation Inc.)
 Flaglor Sky Scooter

Heath 
(Heath Aircraft Co Inc, 1721 Sedgwick St, Chicago, IL)
 Heath 1909 Aeroplane
 Heath 1919 Aeroplane
 Heath V Parasol
 Heath Tomboy
 Heath LNB-4 Parasol
 Heath LN
 Heath Humming Bird
 Heath Feather
 Heath Favorite
 Heath Cannon Ball
 Heath CA-1 Parasol
 Heath Baby Bullet
 Heath 2-B
 International 115 Special
 International 700
 International CNA-40 Centre-Wing
 International HV-2A
 International LNA-40 Parasol
 International LNM-5
 International TN
 International SNA-40 Special

Heath 
(Malcolm R Heath, Warren, OH)
 Heath PH-1

HECC 
(Helicopter Engineering and Construction Corp, RI)
 HECC 100

Heckerson 
(Harold Heckerson (Hickerson?), Stoner Rd, Fostoria, OH)
 Heckerson A-1

Hege 
(Paul Peter Hege, Sedgwick, KS)
 Hege Pup

Hegy 
(Ray C Hegy, Marfa, TX)
 Hegy R.C.H.I. El Chuparosa
 Hegy June Bug

Hegy-Zunker
(Raymond C Hegy and Norman W Zunker, Hartford, WI)
 Hegy-Zunker Special

Heimann-Beachey 
((M A) Heimann-(Hillery) Beachey Aeroplane Mfg Co, St Louis, MO)
 Heimann-Beachey 1911 Biplane

Heimbächer 
(Fritz Heimbächer)
 Heimbächer No 4

Heinemann 
(George (Gernot W) Heinemann, Bellingham, WA)
 Heinemann GH Parasol
 Heinemann Mosquito

Heinkel 
(Ernst Heinkel A.G.)
(note early Heinkel designation did NOT use the RLM He designation but HE-Heinkel Eindecker or HD-Heinkel Doppel-decker)
Heinkel HE 1 low-wing floatplane (monoplane)
Heinkel HE 2 improvement on the HE 1
Heinkel HE 3
Heinkel HE 4 reconnaissance (monoplane)
Heinkel HE 5 reconnaissance (monoplane)
Heinkel HE 8 reconnaissance (monoplane)
Heinkel HE 9
Heinkel HE 10
Heinkel HE 12
Heinkel HD 14
Heinkel HD 15
Heinkel HD 16
Heinkel HD 17
Heinkel HE 18
Heinkel HD 19
Heinkel HD 20
Heinkel HD 21
Heinkel HD 22
Heinkel HD 23
Heinkel HD 24 seaplane trainer (1926)
Heinkel HD 26
Heinkel HD 27
Heinkel HD 28
Heinkel HD 29
Heinkel HD 30
Heinkel HE 31
Heinkel HD 32
Heinkel HD 33
Heinkel HD 35
Heinkel HD 36
Heinkel HD 37 fighter (biplane)
Heinkel HD 38 fighter (biplane)
Heinkel HD 39
Heinkel HD 40
Heinkel HD 41
Heinkel HD 42 seaplane trainer
Heinkel HD 43 fighter (biplane)
Heinkel HD 44
Heinkel HD 55
Heinkel HD 56

(He – Heinkel (RLM designator))
 Heinkel He 45 bomber + trainer
 Heinkel He 46 reconnaissance
 Heinkel He 49 fighter (biplane)
 Heinkel He 50 reconnaissance + dive bomber (biplane)
 Heinkel He 51 fighter + close-support (biplane)
 Heinkel He 52
 Heinkel He 57 Heron
 Heinkel He 58
 Heinkel He 59 reconnaissance (biplane seaplane)
 Heinkel He 60 ship-borne reconnaissance (biplane seaplane)
 Heinkel He 61
 Heinkel He 62
 Heinkel He 63
 Heinkel He 64
 Heinkel He 65
 Heinkel He 66
 Heinkel He 70 Blitz (Lightning), single-engine transport + mailplane, 1932
 Heinkel He 71
 Heinkel He 72 Kadett (Cadet), trainer
 Heinkel He 74 fighter + advanced trainer (prototype)
 Heinkel He 100 fighter
 Heinkel He 111 bomber
 Heinkel He 112 fighter
 Heinkel He 113 (fictitious alternative designation for He 100)
 Heinkel He 114 reconnaissance seaplane
 Heinkel He 115 general-purpose seaplane
 Heinkel He 116 transport + reconnaissance
 Heinkel He 118
 Heinkel He 119 single-engine high-speed bomber(prototypes), reconnaissance aircraft, 1937
 Heinkel He 120 four-engine long-range passenger flying-boat(project), 1938
 Heinkel He 162 "Salamander" Volksjäger (People's Fighter), fighter (jet-engined)
 Heinkel He 170
 Heinkel He 172 trainer (prototype)
 Heinkel He 176 pioneering liquid-fueled rocket-powered experimental aircraft (prototype)
 Heinkel He 177 Greif (Griffon), the Third Reich's only long-range heavy bomber
 Heinkel He 178 world's pioneering jet-engined experimental aircraft
 Heinkel He 219 Uhu (Owl), night-fighter
 Heinkel He 220
 Heinkel He 270
 Heinkel He 274 high-altitude bomber, He 177 development, two prototypes completed post-war in France
 Heinkel He 277 heavy bomber, paper-only He 177 development with four single engines, never built
 Heinkel He 280 fighter (jet-engined)
 Heinkel He 319
 Heinkel He 343 four-engined bomber (jet-engined) (project), 1944
 Heinkel He 419
 Heinkel He 519 high-speed bomber (He 119 derivative)(project only), 1944
 Heinkel KR-1
 Heinkel Army Type 98 Medium Bomber
 Heinkel Navy Type He Air Defence Fighter
 Heinkel Navy Type He Interceptor Fighter
 Heinkel Navy Experimental Type He Attack Plane
 Heinkel Navy Experimental Type He Trainer
 Heinkel Navy Experimental Type He Transport
 Heinkel A7He
 Heinkel AXHe
 Heinkel DXHe
 Heinkel KXHe
 Heinkel LXHe
 Heinkel-Aichi AM-17

Heinonen 
(Juhani Heinonen)
 Heinonen HK-1 Keltiainen
 Heinonen HK-2

Heinrich 
((Albert S and Arthur) Heinrich Aeroplane Co, Baldwin, NY, and Victor Aircraft Corp, Freeport, NY)
 Heinrich 1910 Monoplane
 Heinrich 1911 Monoplane#2
 Heinrich 15
 Heinrich Model B Monoplane
 Heinrich Model C Monoplane
 Heinrich Model D Monoplane
 Heinrich Model E Military Tractor Biplane
 Heinrich Model E-2 Military Tractor Biplane
 Victor 1917 Trainer
 Victor Pursuit
 Victor Advanced Trainer
 Victor D.8

Heintz 
see Zenith or Zenair

Heinz (aircraft constructor) 
 Heinz Floatplane(Lovejoy Curlycraft)
 Heinz 1939 Monoplane

Heiserman 
(Charles Heiserman, Iron Mountain, MI)
 Heiserman 1933 Monoplane
 Heiserman 1937 Monoplane

Heldeberg Designs
(Altamont, NY)
Heldeberg Spirit 103
Heldeberg Marathon
Heldeberg Convertible

Heli-Sport 
(Heli-Sport, Turin, Italy)
 Heli-Sport CH-7 Angel
 Heli-Sport CH-7 Kompress
 Heli-Sport CH-7 Kompress Charlie
 Heli-Sport CH-7 Kompress Charlie 2
 Heli-Sport CH-7 Mariner
 Heli-Sport CH77 Ranabot

Helibras
(Helicopteros do Brasil S/A)
 Helibras HB315B Gavião
 Helibras HB350 Esquilo
 Helibras HB355 Esquilo

Helicom 
(Helicom Inc, Long Beach, CA)
 Helicom H-1 Commuter Jr
 Helicom Commuter II
 Helicom Commuter IIA
 Helicom Commuter IIB

Helicop-Air 
 Helicop-Air L-50 Girhel

Helicop-Jet 
 Helicop-Jet

Helicopters Inc 
(Reformed and renamed from Bendix Helicopters Inc, Stratford, CT)
 Helicopters Inc Model J
 Helicopters Inc Model K

Helicópteros
(Helicópteros de Bolivia SRL / Helicóptero nacional / Helicóptero Boliviano)
 Helicópteros Bolivia I
 Helicópteros AB-32 Sirionó (Sirionó – Jaguar)

Helio 
(1956: Helio Corp & Aeronca Aircraft Corp, Pittsburg, KS; c.1959: Helio Aircraft Corp, Pittsburg, KS; Helio Aircraft Corp, Norwood, MA; 1969: Helio Aircraft Co div of General Aircraft Corp. 1984: Acquired by Aerospace Technology Industries. 1989: Acquired by Aircraft Acquisition Corp and revived as Helio Aircraft Corp, Morgantown, WV; 1992: Helio Enterprises Inc)

 Koppen-Bollinger Helioplane
 Helioplane Two
 Helioplane Four
 Helio Courier
 Helio Rat'ler
 Helio Super courier
 Helio Stallion
 Helio H-250
 Helio H-291
 Helio H-295
 Helio HT-295 Trigear Courier
 Helio H-391 Courier
 Helio H-392 Strato Courier
 Helio H-395 Super Courier
 Helio H-500 Twin Courier
 Helio H-550 Stallion
 Helio H-634 Twin Stallion
 Helio H-700 Courier
 Helio H-800 Courier
 Helio H-1201T Twin Stallion
 Helio L-24 Courier
 Helio L-28 Courier
 Helio U-5 Twin Courier
 Helio U-10 Courier
 Helio AU-24 Stallion

Heliopolis 
(Heliopolis Aircraft Works)
 Heliopolis Gomhouria

Helios 
 Helios Prototype

Helite
(A brand of La Mouette, Messigny, France)
Helite Skydancer
Helite Tsunami

Helle-Franklin 
 Helle-Franklin 1927 Biplane

Hellesen-Kahn
 Hellesen-Kahn HK-1

Helmerichs 
(Henry Helmerichs, Ryegate, MT)
 Helmerichs 1932 monoplane

Helmy
(Saleh Helmy)
 Helmy Aerogypt

Helowerks 
(Helowerks, Hampton, VA)
 Helowerks HX-1 Wasp

Helwan Aircraft Factory
(Helwan / Egyptian General Aero Organisation / Factory No.36)
 Helwan HA-300

Hempearth
 Hempearth Hemp Plane

Hemstreet 
(S Hemstreet, Chattanooga, TN)
 Hemstreet Jessie

Hendershott 
(Ward & Bruce Hendershott, Sioux City, IA)
 Hendershott 1929 Biplane

Henderson Aero Specialties
(Felton, DE)
Henderson Little Bear

Henderson School of Flying
(Brooklands, England)
 Henderson H.S.F.1

Henderson-Glenny
 Henderson-Glenny Gadfly

Hendrick 
(C J Hendrick, Middletown, NJ)
 Hendrick 1910 Monoplane

Hendrickson 
(O J Hendrickson, Middletown, NJ)
 Hendrickson 1910 Biplane

Hendy 
 Hendy 302
 Hendy Heck
 Hendy Hobo

Hennessey 
(James R Hennessey)
 Hennessey 1926 Monoplane

Hennesy 
(Gerald Hennesy, Washington, DC)
 Henesy Monoplane

Hennion 
(Emile Hennion)
 Hennion I
 Hennion II

Henri Farman 
See: Farman Aviation Works

Henschel 
(Henschel Flugzeugwerke A.G.)
 Henschel Hs 121
 Henschel Hs 122
 Henschel Hs 123
 Henschel Hs 124
 Henschel Hs 125
 Henschel Hs 126
 Henschel Hs 127
 Henschel Hs 128
 Henschel Hs 129
 Henschel Hs 130
 Henschel Hs 132

Hensley 
(Edward Freeland Hensley, Oklahoma City, OK)
 Hensley 1936 Biplane

Hensley 
(Hensley Aircraft)
 Hensley H1 Wolf

Herbst 
(Frank Herbst, Wilmington, NC)
 Herbst 1911 Aeroplane

HERC
(Helicopter Engineering and Research Corporation)
 HERC JOV-3

Hereter 
(Talleres Hereter – Barcelona)
 Hereter T.H. (Alfaro 8)

Herff 
(Adolph P Herff & Orval H Snyder, San Antonio and Boeme, TX)
 Herff 1909 Aeroplane
 Herff 1926 Aeroplane

Hergt 
(F.D. Hergt / Fliegerersatz-Abteilung 1- F.E.A. 1 – pilot reserve section 1)
 Hergt Monoplane

Hermann 
(Ateliers Fred Herrmann)
 de Glymes DG X (DG-10)

Hermes 
 Hermes Concept

Hermeus 
 Hermeus Concept

Hernandez 
(Frank Hernandez, San Diego, CA)
 Hernandez Rapier 65

Herr 
(Harold D Herr, Millersville, PA)
 Herr Eaglet

Herren 
((Wilson) Herren Aeronautical Corp, Barrington, IL)
 Herren CL-32

Herrick 
(Gerald & Myron Herrick, Philadelphia, PA)
 Herrick HV-1
 Herrick HV-2 Vertaplane
 Herrick HV-3 Vertaplane

Hershfield 
(Harry A Hershfield Jr, Santa Rosa, NM)
 Hershfield VJA Special

Hervey 
(George H Hervey, San Fernando, CA)
 Hervey Travelplane

Herzog 
(R D Herzog (Herzog Bros), Harvard, NE)
 Herzog Meteor
 Herzog Model 2

HESA 
(a.k.a.Iran Aircraft Manufacturing Industries Corporation (IAMI))
 HESA Azarakhsh
 HESA Saeqeh
 HESA IrAn-140
 HESA IrAn-148
 HESA Shahed X5
 HESA Shahed 274
 HESA Shahed 278
 HESA Shahed 285
 HESA Dorna
 HESA Yasin
 HESA Shabaviz 2-75
 HESA Shabaviz 2061

Hesley 
(Bob Hesley, Houston, TX)
 Hesley Pussy Cat

Hess 
((Adrian T & Aubrey W) Hess Aircraft Co Inc, Van Alstyne Blvd, Wyandotte, MI)
 Hess H-1 Bluebird
 Hess H-2 Bluebird

Heston 
 Heston Type 1 Phoenix
 Heston Type 5 Racer
 Heston T.1/37
 Heston JC.6 (A.2/45)

Heuberger 
(Lawrence K Heuberger, El Paso, TX and Los Alamitos, CA)
 Heuberger Doodle Bug
 Heuberger Sizzler
 Heuberger Stinger

Hewa Technics 
 Hewa Technics J-5 Marco

References

Further reading

External links

 List of aircraft (H-He)

fr:Liste des aéronefs (E-H)